Lucy Beaumont (born Lucy Emily Pinkstone; 18 May 1869 – 24 April 1937) was an English actress of the stage and screen from Bristol.

Biography

On Broadway, Beaumont played Lady Emily Lyons in The Bishop Misbehaves (1935) and Mrs. Barwick in Berkeley Square (1925). A 1932 revival of Berkeley Square, featuring Beaumont, Miriam Seegar, George Baxter and Henry Mowbray, was staged in San Francisco by Arthur Greville Collins. During the 1914–15 season Beaumont was in My Lady's Dress at the Playhouse in New York. The following season she was featured in Quinneys, for part of the play's run. In 1916 she appeared with Frances Starr in Little Lady in Blue.

Beaumont played mostly mother parts on the screen. Some of her films are The Greater Glory (1926), with Conway Tearle, The Man Without A Country (1925), with Pauline Starke, Torrent (1926), with Ricardo Cortez, The Beloved Rogue, with John Barrymore, Resurrection (1927), with Dolores del Río, The Crowd (1928), with Eleanor Boardman and Maid of Salem (1937), her final motion picture, with Claudette Colbert. Her final professional appearance was in April 1937 on the Robert L. Ripley radio programme.

Beaumont's films spanned a variety of genres.

Personal life
Beaumont was married to Captain Douglas Vigors until his death. She had no children. She died in 1937 at the Royalton Hotel in New York City. She had been in America for 20 years prior to her death.

Partial filmography

 Sandy Burke of the U-Bar-U (1919) - Widow Mackey
 Ashes of Vengeance (1923) - Charlotte
 Lucretia Lombard (1923) - Mrs. Winship
 Enemies of Children (1923)
 Cupid's Fireman (1923) - Mother
 The Good Bad Boy (1924) - Mrs. Benson
 The Last of the Duanes (1924) - Bland's Wife
 The Family Secret (1924) - Miss Abigail Selfridge
 As No Man Has Loved (1925) - Mrs. Nolan
 The Trouble with Wives (1925) - Grace's Mother
 Torrent (1926) - Doña Pepa
 The Greater Glory (1926) - Tante Ilde
 Along Came Auntie (1926, Short) - Aunt Alvira
 Men of the Night (1926) - Mrs. Abbott
 The Old Soak (1926) - Mrs. Hawley
 The Fighting Failure (1926)
 Savage Passions (1926)
 The Love Wager (1927)
 The Beloved Rogue (1927) - Villon's Mother
 Resurrection (1927) - Aunt Sophya
 Closed Gates (1927) - Mary Newell
 Stranded (1927) - Grandmother
 The Thirteenth Hour (1927) - Woman strangled at mansion (uncredited)
 Hook and Ladder No. 9 (1927) - Mother Smith
 Outcast Souls (1928) - Mrs. Mary Davis
 Comrades (1928) - Mrs. Dixon
 The Crowd (1928) - Mother
 The Little Yellow House (1928) - Mrs. Milburn
 A Bit of Heaven (1928) - Aunt Priscilla
 The Branded Man (1928) - The Mother
 Stool Pigeon (1928) - Mrs. Wells
 The Greyhound Limited (1929) - Mrs. Williams - Bill's Mother
 Sonny Boy (1929) - Mother Thorpe
 Hardboiled Rose (1929) - Grandmama Duhamel
 One Splendid Hour (1929) - Mother Kelly
 The Ridin' Demon (1929) - Mrs. Riordan
 The Girl in the Show (1929) - Lorna Montrose
 Scarlet Pages (1930) - Martha, Mary's housekeeper(uncredited)
 A Free Soul (1931) - Grandma Ashe
 Caught Plastered (1931) - Mother Talley
 New Adventures of Get Rich Quick Wallingford (1931) - Mrs. Dalrymple - Cleaning Lady (uncredited)
 Three Wise Girls (1932) - Mrs. Barnes, Cassie's Mother
 Cheaters at Play (1932)
 Disorderly Conduct (1932) - Mrs. Fay (uncredited)
 State's Attorney (1932) - Member of the Jury (uncredited)
 The Midnight Lady (1932) - Grandma Austin
 Is My Face Red? (1932) - Geraldine Tucker (uncredited)
 Movie Crazy (1932) - Mrs. Hall
 Thrill of Youth (1932) - Grandma Thayer
 His Double Life (1933) - Mrs. Leek
 Blind Justice (1934) - Mrs. Summers
 Temptation (1934) - Headmistress
 Condemned to Live (1935) - Mother Molly
 False Pretenses (1935) - Miss Milgrim
 The Devil-Doll (1936) - Mme. Lavond
 Maid of Salem (1937) - Rebecca - Nurse (final film role)

References

Sources
Lima Daily News, "Along Broadway", 3 October 1917, pg 3.
The New York Times, Lucy Beaumont Dies; Actress Many Years, 25 April 1937, pg. 42

External links

Lucy Beaumont (middle) with Marceline Day and John Barrymore in The Beloved Rogue

English film actresses
English silent film actresses
English stage actresses
English radio actresses
1869 births
1937 deaths
20th-century English actresses
British expatriate actresses in the United States